Colin Blair (born 17 September 1957 in Glasgow) is a British former racing driver best known for his short time driving in the British Touring Car Championship. After working for a recruitment company, he didn't start in motor sport until the age of thirty-nine.

Racing career
He spent two years in 1997 and 1998, racing in the Scottish Road saloon car champion with a class A Ford Sierra RS500. In 1999 he drove a class A Ford Escort in the Ford Saloon Car Challenge, where he finished the season in second place. He stepped up to the BTCC in 2000, with an independent Nissan Primera GT. This was the last year of the Super Touring era and there was a very small field of drivers, with no more than eleven class A cars starting at one time. Blair only raced in selected rounds, sharing the car with David Leslie. He finished the season second in the independents championship behind the only other Indy driver Matt Neal, and eleventh in the overall drivers championship. In 2001 he drove in the production class BTCC with GA Janspeed Racing in an Alfa Romeo 156 with team mate Gavin Pyper, finishing in eighteenth place.

Racing record

Complete British Touring Car Championship results
(key) (Races in bold indicate pole position - 1 point awarded all races, 2001 in class) (Races in italics indicate fastest lap - 1 point awarded all races in 2001 only, 2001 in class) (* signifies that driver lead feature race for at least one lap - 1 point awarded, 2001 in class)

External links
 Official BTCC 2000 standings.
 BTCC Pages profile.

1957 births
British Touring Car Championship drivers
Living people